Claut is a comune (municipality) in the Province of Pordenone in the Italian region Friuli-Venezia Giulia, located about  northwest of Trieste and about  northwest of Pordenone.

Claut borders the following municipalities: Barcis, Chies d'Alpago, Cimolais, Erto e Casso, Forni di Sopra, Forni di Sotto, Frisanco, Pieve d'Alpago, Tramonti di Sopra.

People
Dario Grava
Roger Grava

References

External links
 Official website

Cities and towns in Friuli-Venezia Giulia